IMG Models is an international modeling agency headquartered in New York City and with additional offices in London, Los Angeles, Milan, Paris, and Sydney. It is a subsidiary of the talent management company International Management Group. The company merged with William Morris Endeavor in 2013. In 2015, the agency represented more than half of the highest paid supermodels. Ivan Bart is the current President, and Lisa Marie Benson is the Vice President.

History 
IMG Models was founded circa 1987 by sports agent Mark McCormack. In 1994, Ivan Bart joined the company as the creative director and later became IMG Models' president in 2013. Tyra Banks and Niki Taylor joined, followed by Angela Lindvall, Bridget Hall, Carolyn Murphy, Gisele Bündchen and Kate Moss.

In September 2012, IMG decided to reintroduce their men's division, after its dismantling in 2007.

In 2013, Bart decided to sign models without regard to traditional height, weight, race, or age requirements, or other factors that historically have prevented diversity in model casting.

In 2014, IMG Models began a scouting initiative on Instagram called #WLYG (We Love Your Genes). Models that have been discovered through this process include Lameka Fox, Alyssa Traoré, and Gizele Oliveira. They also have done online scouting via their website.

Models

Notable models currently represented by IMG include:
Roos Abels
Alexandra Agoston
Lily Aldridge
Ruby Aldridge
Tyson Ballou
Nick Bateman
Hailey Bieber
Bianca Balti
Sonia Ben Ammar
Thylane Blondeau
Bonner Bolton
Maria Borges
Pietro Boselli
Baby Bella
Chase Carter
Will Chalker
Quannah Chasinghorse
Lily Cole
Lior Cole
Sailor Brinkley Cook
Montana Cox
Joséphine de La Baume
Elibeidy Dani
Alex Consani
Emily DiDonato
Lily Donaldson
Jourdan Dunn
Oriol Elcacho
Paloma Elsesser
Karen Elson
Ella Emhoff
Hannah Ferguson
Georgia Fowler
Lameka Fox
Charlee Fraser
Jessica Gomes
Ashley Graham
Quiana Grant
Eileen Gu
Anna Mila Guyenz
Bella Hadid
Gigi Hadid
Julia Hafstrom
Shalom Harlow
Taylor Hill
Candice Huffine
Martha Hunt
Lauren Hutton
Chanel Iman
Elaine Irwin
Paris Jackson
Hannah Jeter
Milla Jovovich
Xiao Wen Ju
Du Juan 
Wisdom Kaye
Miranda Kerr
Mathias Lauridsen
Nadine Leopold
Angela Lindvall
Sasha Luss
Tara Lynn
Grace Mahary
Bridget Malcolm
Alton Mason
Miles McMillan
Noah Mills
Riley Montana
Licett Morillo
Camila Morrone
Fernanda Motta
Amanda Murphy
Carolyn Murphy
Hari Nef
Garrett Neff
Demi-Leigh Nel-Peters
Bambi Northwood-Blyth
Lily Nova
Gizele Oliveira
Barbara Palvin
Soo Joo Park
Nicola Peltz
Will Peltz
Sasha Pivovarova
Albert Reed
Hilary Rhoda
Meghan Roche
Kelly Rohrbach
Ola Rudnicka
Stephanie Seymour
Shanina Shaik
Hyun Ji Shin
Diana Silvers
Joan Smalls
Lucky Blue Smith
Jessica Stam
Romee Strijd
Elyse Taylor
Chrissy Teigen
Stephen Thompson
Ai Tominaga
Alyssa Traoré
Nicole Trunfio
Andrés Velencoso
Gemma Ward
Yasmin Warsame
Erin Wasson
Alek Wek
Jacquetta Wheeler
Jeneil Williams
Maddie Ziegler

References 

1987 establishments in New York City
American companies established in 1987
Entertainment companies based in New York City
Entertainment companies established in 1987
Mass media companies based in New York City
Mass media companies established in 1987
Modeling agencies